Al-Samik is a town in the Amman Governorate in northwestern Jordan.

References

External Links
Photos of Samik at the American Center of Research

Populated places in Amman Governorate